The Moon System of Embossed Reading (commonly known as the Moon writing, Moon alphabet, Moon script, Moon type, or Moon code) is a writing system for the blind, using embossed symbols mostly derived from the Latin script (but simplified). It is claimed by its supporters to be easier to understand than braille, though it is mainly used by people who have lost their sight as adults, and thus already have knowledge of the shapes of letters.

History

Moon type was developed by William Moon (1818—1894), a blind Englishman living in Brighton, East Sussex. After a bout of scarlet fever, Moon lost his sight at age 21 and became a teacher of blind children.  He discovered that his pupils had great difficulty learning to read the existing styles of embossed reading codes, and devised his own system that would be "open and clear to the touch."

Moon first formulated his ideas in 1843 and published the scheme in 1845. Moon is not as well known as braille, but it is a valuable alternative touch reading scheme for the blind or partially sighted people of any age.

Rather than the dots of braille type, Moon type is made up of raised curves, angles, and lines. As the characters are quite large and over half the letters bear a strong resemblance to the print equivalent, Moon has been found particularly suitable for those who lose their sight later in life or for people who may have a less keen sense of touch. It has also proved successful as a mode of literacy for children with additional physical and/or learning difficulties.

Schools can borrow very simple children's books with added Moon type from the Clearvision Project in London.

Foreign languages

English Christian missionaries in Ningbo (Ningpo), China, during the Qing dynasty used Moon type to teach blind locals how to read Ningbo. Missionaries who spoke the Ningbo dialect ran the "Home for Indigent Old People" where most of the inmates were blind. In 1874, an English missionary taught a young blind man to read romanised Ningbo written in Moon type. The Gospel of Luke was then transcribed into two large volumes of Moon type. A Swiss missionary placed notices on placards throughout Ningbo stating that he would give food and money to the blind people who visited. The Gospel of Mark was transcribed into Moon type using romanized Mandarin, however, without the tone marks. Missionary Hudson Taylor, who had been involved with the transcription of the gospels, did not find tone marks necessary, as the romanised Ningbo vernacular has never used tone marks. However, aspirated consonants were distinguished.

Characters

Letters

As with braille, there is a Grade 1 using one Moon character per one Latin character and a Grade 2 using contractions and shorthand that make texts more compact and faster to read, though requiring more study.

Numbers
Similarly to Braille, the initial version of Moon type used the first ten letters with a "number start" symbol as digits.

A later version used different symbols for each digit (StaffsMaths). These symbols are more complex to print.

Punctuation
The type also includes punctuation.

Dotty Moon
Besides the original type formed by lines, there is the possibility of using certain Braille embossers to produce dot patterns (Dotty Moon or Dotted Moon) in the shape of Moon characters. The patterns are disposed as a 5x5 grid.

Direction
Initially the text changed direction (but not character orientation) at the end of the lines. Special embossed lines connected the end of a line and the beginning of the next. Around 1990, it changed to a left-to-right orientation.

Reception
The Royal National Institute for the Blind for wider universality prefers braille.

References

Bibliography

External links
 
 "Moon Alphabet"
 "William Moon"
 The Moon System of Embossed Reading
 Online Moon Type Generator
 [http://www.clearvisionproject.org/Books/index.html ClearVision Project books page
 Moon page at the RNIB.
 Learning Moon
 "Preliminary proposal for encoding the Moon script in the SMP of the UCS" at Unicode.org

Tactile alphabets
Latin-script representations
1845 introductions